Darreh Barik (also Romanized as Darreh Bārīk) is a village in Hati Rural District, Hati District, Lali County, Khuzestan Province, Iran. In the 2006 census, it was found that the population was 73, in 15 families.

References 

Populated places in Lali County